3C 268.3 is a Seyfert galaxy/quasar located in the constellation Ursa Major.

See also
 Lists of galaxies

References

External links
 www.jb.man.ac.uk/atlas/ (J. P. Leahy)

Quasars
Ursa Major (constellation)
268.3
2821643